Gyrtona albicans is a moth of the family Noctuidae. It is found in Papua New Guinea.

References

Stictopterinae
Moths of Papua New Guinea